"Love Bingo!" is the second Japanese single released by Korean boy group The Boss. It was released on June 15, 2011 on the Japanese label Sony Music Entertainment.

Single information
The single was released in three different versions, including a regular edition, limited edition A and limited edition B. Limited edition A includes a CD, a DVD and a booklet while limited edition B includes a CD and a DVD. Regular edition comes with a CD and a random trading photo.

Track list

CD

Limited edition A DVD

Limited edition B DVD

Chart performance

Release history

References

External links
大国男児 | Sony Music 
The Boss official website 

Japanese-language albums